Madaki may refer to:

Places

 Madiki (village), a village on the island of Aruba
 Kafin Madaki, headquarters of Ganjuwa Local Government Area of Bauchi State, Nigeria

People

 John Madaki, former military governor of Katsina State, Nigeria
 Joshua Madaki, former was military governor of Bauchi State, and then of Plateau State, Nigeria
 Yohanna Madaki, former military governor of Gongola State and then of Benue State, Nigeria